The Outback Highway or Outback Way is a series of roads and dirt tracks linking Laverton, Western Australia and Winton, Queensland. At , it crosses Central Australia (colloquially known as the Outback), passing through Western Australia, the Northern Territory and Queensland.

Proposed upgrade
It has been proposed as a development to provide an inland route between southern Western Australia and northern Queensland as an alternative to the National Highway 1 along either coast.

Roads that make up the highway are:

 Great Central Road
 Gunbarrel Highway
 Lasseter Highway
 Stuart Highway
 Plenty Highway
 Donohue Highway
 Kennedy Development Road

Support for the project is strong amongst local government areas along the route and elsewhere. The project has secured over $400 million in funding; 80% Federal funding and 20% from the Western Australia, Northern Territory, and Queensland governments. As at June 2021 there is 1200km to seal.

Major intersections

See also

 Highways in Australia
 List of highways in the Northern Territory
 List of highways in Queensland
 List of highways in Western Australia

References

Further reading

External links
Outback Highway official website

Highways in Australia
Australian outback